The DOS Wedge is a piece of Commodore 64 system software that was popular in its time. It was written by Bob Fairbairn, and was included by Commodore (CBM) on the 1541 disk drive Test/Demo Disk (filename: "DOS 5.1") and also packaged with the C64 Macro Assembler (filename: "DOS WEDGE64"). The DOS Wedge was referred to in the 1541 drive manual as DOS Support and on the software startup screen as DOS MANAGER. The original design was developed by Bill Seiler.

The Wedge made disk operations in BASIC 2.0 significantly easier by introducing several keyword shortcuts. The DOS Wedge became somewhat of a de facto standard, with third-party vendors such as Epyx often incorporating identical commands into fastloader cartridges and other Commodore 64 expansion devices. COMPUTE!'s Gazette published several type-in variations on the DOS Wedge, including a C128 version in its February 1987 issue (see External links, below).

The original Commodore DOS Wedge was a 1-KB program written in MOS 6502 assembly language. It resided in the otherwise unused memory block $CC00–$CFFF (52224–53247) and worked by altering BASIC's "CHRGET" subroutine at $0073 (115) so that each character passing by the BASIC interpreter would be checked for wedge commands, and the associated "wedged-in" routines run if needed.

DOS Wedge functions
Any command that contains an  symbol may substitute  instead, if desired.

See also
Comparison of computer shells

References
CBM Professional Computer Division (1982). Commodore 64 Macro Assembler Development System Manual. West Chester, PA: Commodore Business Machines. Chapter 5.0. Additional BASIC Disk Commands.

External links
Commodore DOS Wedges: An Overview - Jim Butterfield, COMPUTE!, October 1983.
DOS Wedge documentation (MS Word format)
Commodore 64 Macro Assembler Development System Manual
COMPUTE!'s Gazette February 1987 issue: "DOS Wedge 128" (Part A), (Part B)
Commodore Disk Loading Basics
Commodore 1541 Drive Manual (ZIPped text file)

Commodore 64 software
Command shells
Assembly language software